The 1990 SEC Men’s Basketball Tournament was held March 8–11, 1990 at the Orlando Arena in Orlando, Florida. The Alabama Crimson Tide won the tournament and received the SEC’s automatic bid to the 1990 NCAA Men’s Division I Basketball Tournament by defeating the Ole Miss Rebels by a score of 70–51.

Television coverage of the first round, the quarterfinals, and semifinals were regionally syndicated by Jefferson Pilot Sports, and the championship game was nationally televised on ABC.
  
Note: The Kentucky Wildcats men's basketball team was not qualified to participate in either the SEC or NCAA tournaments of 1990 and 1991 due to NCAA probation.

Bracket

References

SEC men's basketball tournament
1989–90 Southeastern Conference men's basketball season
1990 in sports in Florida
Basketball competitions in Orlando, Florida
1990s in Orlando, Florida
College sports tournaments in Florida